Crowned in Terror is the fifth album by Swedish melodic death metal band The Crown. This is one of two albums by The Crown not to have Johan Lindstrand on vocals (although he did some backing vocals on the album). Instead Tomas Lindberg handled the vocal duties. Later, the vocals were re-recorded by Lindstrand and the album was re-released as Crowned Unholy.

On 24 May 2002, the album was ranked an #1 in the Loud Rock section of the CMJ New Music Report magazine.

In 2018, The Crown had announced the re-issue of Crowned in Terror vinyls. The vinyls will be sold as either 180 g black vinyl, amber marbled, clear teal marbled, or bone white marbled in the European Union and as orange-brown marbled vinyl in the United States.

Track listing

Personnel
The Crown
Magnus Olsfelt - bass
Tomas Lindberg - vocals
Marcus Sunesson - guitars
Marko Tervonen - guitars
Janne Saarenpää -drums
Dr. Johan Lindstrand - backing vocals on "Death Metal Holocaust"

Production
M. Engstrom - mixing
Kenneth Johansson - photography
Thomas Ewerhard - cover art, layout
Kenneth Svensson - mastering
Marcus Sunesson - recording
Marko Tervonen - recording
Chris Silver - producer, recording, mixing
Mark Brand - artwork

References

The Crown (band) albums
2002 albums
Metal Blade Records albums